The Hinterer Tajakopf is a mountain, 2,408 metres high, in the Mieming Range in the Austrian state of Tyrol.

The Hintere Tajakopf may be ascended from the Coburger Hut (1,917 m) via the Hinteres Tajatörl (2,259 m) to the south and the south arête. Alternatively the Coburger Klettersteig runs to the top from the Vorderen Tajatörl to the north. This ascent is frequently combined with the klettersteig on the Vorderer Tajakopf (2,450 m) to the north of the Vorderes Tajatörl.

West of the summit at just under 2,300 metres are the remains of an abandoned mine. In the area around the Coburger Hut lead and zinc ore was mined until the 20th century.

On the actual summit is only a small wooden cross. A few metres away on a smooth rocky ridge, accessible via a short, protected passage, is a large summit cross with a summit register.

Literature 
 Rudolf Wutscher: Mieminger Kette. Ein Führer für Täler, Hütten und Berge (= Alpine Club Guide. Ostalpen.). Verfasst nach den Richtlinien der UIAA. Bergverlag Rother, Munich, 1989, pp. 164–166.

External links 
 

Two-thousanders of Austria
Mountains of the Alps
Mieming Range